Ganglion is a biological tissue mass, most commonly a mass of nerve cell bodies.

Ganglion may also refer to:
Ganglion cyst
Ganglion (band), a musical act from Calgary, Alberta, Canada

See also 
 Ganglia (disambiguation)